Mekan Nasyrov (born 16 April 1982) is a Turkmenistan footballer who has formerly plays for Persik Kediri, Barito Putera, and Semen Padang.

Career
In February 2009, Nasyrov signed for Gabala along with Victor Comleonoc and Pāvels Doroševs. Nasyrov made eight appearances for Gabala before he leaving six-months later for Persik Kediri in Indonesia. In 2012 he is join to PS Barito Putera, and out to Persik Kediri in 2013. Join again to PS Barito Putera in 2014, and last joined to Semen Padang F.C.

International career
He is a member of the Turkmenistan national football team.

Club career statistics

International career statistics

Goals for senior national team
Scores and results list Turkmenistan's goal tally first.

Honours

Club honors
Şagadam Türkmenbaşy
Ýokary Liga (1): 2002

Nisa Aşgabat
Ýokary Liga (1): 2003

Persibo Bojonegoro
Piala Indonesia (1): 2012

References

External links
 

1982 births
Living people
People from Mary, Turkmenistan
Turkmenistan footballers
Turkmenistan international footballers
Expatriate footballers in Azerbaijan
Turkmenistan expatriate footballers
Persik Kediri players
Persibo Bojonegoro players
PS Barito Putera players
Expatriate footballers in Indonesia
Gabala FC players
Turkmenistan expatriate sportspeople in Azerbaijan
Turkmenistan expatriate sportspeople in Indonesia
Association football midfielders